Atalanta Bergamasca Calcio is an Italian professional football club based in Bergamo, Lombardy, Italy. The club was founded in 1907 and it currently competes in Serie A, the top tier of the Italian football league system. Since the establishment of a unified league structure in 1929, Atalanta has spent a total of 61 seasons in Serie A, 28 seasons in Serie B, and one season in Serie C.

Throughout its history, Atalanta has had a total of 59 managers, including player-managers, assistant managers acting as head coach, and caretaker managers. Thirteen managers were in charge on multiple occasions. The club hired its first professional coach, Cesare Lovati, in 1925, and the current head coach is Gian Piero Gasperini. Atalanta's only manager to win a major trophy is Paolo Tabanelli, under whom the club won the Coppa Italia in 1963.

Managerial history

Longest-serving managers 
Current manager Gian Piero Gasperini, who led the club to its highest league finishes and UEFA Champions League qualification between 2019 and 2021, has the most appearances as manager in the club's history (300 ) and the longest uninterrupted tenure as Atalanta manager (over six consecutive seasons). He became the club's longest-serving manager on 9 October 2022, when he oversaw his 300th game with Atalanta.

The club's second longest-serving manager is Emiliano Mondonico, who oversaw 299 matches in all competitions in two spells (1987–90 and 1994–98), including some of the club's matches in the European Cup Winners' Cup and the UEFA Cup.

Stefano Colantuono, who also was manager on two different occasions (2005–07 and 2010–15), is the manager with the most appearances in league matches (261, compared to 246 for Mondonico) in two spells (2005–07 and 2010–15), and third-most appearances in total (281).

Other relatively long-serving managers include Ivo Fiorentini, Battista Rota, Ferruccio Valcareggi, Giovanni Vavassori, Nedo Sonetti, Giulio Corsini, Luigi Bonizzoni, and Imre Payer, all of whom recorded over 100 appearances as manager.

List of managers

Notes

References

Bibliography
 
 

Atalanta B.C. managers
Lists of association football managers by club in Italy